In Baháʼí cosmology reality is divided into three divisions. The first division is God, who is preexistent and on whom the rest of creation is contingent. The second division is God's Logos, the Primal Will, which is the realm of God's commands and grace. This realm pervades all created things. The Manifestations of God, Messengers from God, are appearances of the Logos in the physical world. The third division is Creation, which includes the physical world. Creation is not seen as confined to the material universe, and individual material objects, such as the Earth, are seen to come into being at particular moment and then subsequently break down into their constituent parts. Thus, the current universe is seen as a result of a long-lasting process (cosmological time scales), evolving to its current state. In the Baháʼí Faith, the whole universe is a sign of God and is dependent on him and humanity was created to know God and to serve his purpose.

Realms
Baháʼu'lláh, the founder of the Baháʼí Faith, distinguished five realms of existence. The terminology used can partly be traced back to Islamic Neoplatonism and Sufism, but this does not mean that Baháʼu'lláh supports a Neoplatonist or Sufi worldview. He views all metaphysical viewpoints as relative, reflecting only the soul or psyche and cultural background of the individual rather than any Absolute Truth. The Baháʼí teachings de-emphasize the importance of metaphysics, while focusing primarily on social and personal ethics.

God is manifested in all five realms, the Manifestations of God in all but the first realm, and humans exist between the angelic and physical realms and can choose which to live in.

All the divine worlds revolve around this world, and all are interdependent. The divine worlds can only be described by metaphors, and can be compared with the world of dreams. The realms of Nasut and Malakut are parts of the 'world of creation' and are ruled by the same spiritual laws. The purpose of life in this world is to develop spiritual qualities that are needed in the next world.

Man has a free will to live a material life in the world of Nasut, or a life of detachment in the realm of Malakut, manifesting the names and attributes of God. Baháʼu'lláh explains that the 'realm of subtle entities' (ʻalam-i-dharr, a reference to God's primordial covenant with humanity mentioned in Qurʼán 7:172) refers to the revelation of the Prophets. Before the Word of God is revealed, all people are considered equal in rank. Differences only appear after the Prophet reveals himself, caused by the different responses of each individual's free will.

Baháʼu'lláh also wrote of many worlds of God. In the Súriy-i-Vafa, he writes: "Know thou of a truth that the worlds of God are countless in their number, and infinite in their range. None can reckon or comprehend them except God, the All-Knowing, the All-Wise." ʻAbdu'l-Bahá, son and successor of Baháʼu'lláh, writes in the Lawh-i-Aflákiyyih (Tablet of the Universe) that there are infinite Manifestations of God in the infinite worlds of God.

Baháʼu'lláh explained that while humans should seek knowledge, no human can understand the nature of God's creation or God himself. He stated that while God had given humans a rational mind, humans are unable to comprehend the inner reality.

See also
 Arcs of Descent and Ascent
 Baháʼí Faith and the unity of religion
 Baháʼí Faith on life after death
 Baháʼí Faith and science
 Some Answered Questions
 Cosmology in medieval Islam
 Sufi cosmology
 Religious cosmology
 Rūḥ and Nafs

Notes

References

Further reading
 Lepain,  Jean-Marc (2015) [2002]. The Archeology of the Kingdom of God.
 Ma'sumian, Bijan. Realms of Divine Existence as described in the Tablet of All Food, in Deepen, 3.2.2, pp. 11–17, 1994 Summer.
 Mihrshahi, Robin (2013). A Wondrous New Day: The Numerology of Creation and 'All Things' in the Badíʻ Calendar.

External links
 The Loom of Reality, thematic compilations of quotations from the Bahá’í Writings and beyond
Reality, Soul and the Worlds of God, compilation
Iscander Tinto: The Worlds of God (archived)
More articles on Baháʼí cosmology and related subjects on Baháʼí Library (various authors)

Bahá'í belief and doctrine
Bahá'í terminology
Religious cosmologies